Joshua van Wyk (born 14 October 1998) is a South African racing cyclist.

Major results

2015
 1st  Individual pursuit, African Junior Track Championships
 Junior National Track Championships
1st  Individual pursuit
1st  Team pursuit
1st  Scratch
2016
 Junior National Track Championships
1st  Keirin
1st  Team pursuit
2017
 1st  Team pursuit, African Track Championships (with Nolan Hoffman, Steven van Heerden and Jean Spies)
 1st  Team pursuit, National Track Championships (with Gert Fouche, Bradley Gouveris and Jean Spies)
2018
 African Track Championships
1st  Team pursuit (with Jean Spies, Steven van Heerden and Gert Fouche)
3rd Points race
2019
 African Track Championships
1st  Points race
1st  Madison (with Steven van Heerden)
1st  Omnium
2nd Scratch
 1st  Scratch, National Track Championships
 1st Stage 3 (TTT) Tour of Good Hope
2020
 African Track Championships
1st  Team sprint
1st  Madison (with Steven van Heerden)
1st  Scratch

References

External links
 
 

1998 births
Living people
South African track cyclists
South African male cyclists
People from Boksburg
Sportspeople from Gauteng
Cyclists at the 2018 Commonwealth Games
Commonwealth Games competitors for South Africa
20th-century South African people
21st-century South African people